Giovanni Scuderi (born 24 May 1935, in Avola) is an Italian politician and General Secretary of the Italian Marxist–Leninist Party, established by him and others on 10 April 1977 in Florence.

Biography 
Scuderi has always had a strong political commitment to Marxism–Leninism. In 1967, along with three other comrades, he joined the Federation of Marxist–Leninist Communists of Italy, but broke in 1968 and joined the Communist Party of Italy (Marxist–Leninist), becoming its Provincial Secretary of Florence. He had a clash with Angiolo Gracci that split from the party and then with General Secretary Fosco Dinucci.

In 1969, he established the Italian Bolshevik Communist Organization Marxist–Leninist and Il Bolscevico (The Bolshevik). He was the newspaper's first political director and supported the unity of the Italian Maoists against revisionism of the Italian Communist Party, but his appeals were mainly unheard by the then Italian Marxist–Leninists. In 1977, he established the Italian Marxist–Leninist Party and became its General Secretary.

During his political struggle, he wrote some works and an essay for the International Seminary on Marxism–Leninism. His works are currently diffused in Italy, Mexico and Ukraine.

Scuderi lives in Florence, where there is the headquarters of the Italian Marxist–Leninist Party.

Controversial views 
On 11 October 2015 at the 5th Plenary Session of the 5th Party Central Committee held in Florence, Scuderi affirmed his support for ISIL against the global forces of imperialism.

See also 
Italian Marxist–Leninist Party
 Italian Bolshevik Communist Organization Marxist–Leninist
 Marxism-Leninism
 Stalinism
 Maoism
 Anti-revisionism

References

|-

|-

1935 births
Stalinism
Maoists
Anti-revisionists
Italian communists
Italian politicians
Living people
People from Avola